NTSH may refer to:

 New Taipei Municipal New Taipei Senior High School, a high school in Taiwan
 North Texas State Hospital, a hospital in the United States
 In informal writing it is an acronym for "Nothing to see here"